Dr. Mario may refer to:

In video games:
 Dr. Mario, a 1990 Mario action puzzle video game for the NES, Game Boy, and other Nintendo consoles.
 Dr. Mario 64, a 2001 puzzle video game for the Nintendo 64.
 Dr. Mario Express, a 2008 DSiWare puzzle video game for the Nintendo DSi.
 Dr. Mario Online Rx, a 2008 WiiWare puzzle video game for the Nintendo Wii.
 Dr. Mario: Miracle Cure, a 2015 puzzle video game for the Nintendo 3DS.
 Dr. Mario World, a 2019 match-three game for mobile devices.

In medicine:
 Jorge Mario García Laguardia, also known as Dr. Jorge Mario García Laguardia, a Guatemalan jurist.
 Mario Costa (diplomat), also known as Dr. Mario Costa, the Republic of Malta Ambassador to the Russian Federation.
 Mario Díaz Martínez, also known as Dr. Mario Díaz Martínez, one of 12 elected volunteer members of the World Scout Committee.
 Mario Raviglione, also known as Dr. Mario Raviglione, Director of the Stop TB Department.

In sports:
 Estádio Martins Pereira, also known as Estádio Municipal Dr. Mário Martins Pereira, a football stadium in São José dos Campos, São Paulo.